Todd of the Times is a lost 1919 American silent comedy film directed by Eliot Howe and starring Frank Keenan, Charles A. Post, and Aggie Herring.

Cast

References

External links 
 
 

1919 films
1919 comedy films
Silent American comedy films
American silent feature films
1910s English-language films
Pathé Exchange films
American black-and-white films
1910s American films